Muromsky District is an administrative and municipal district (raion), one of the sixteen in Vladimir Oblast, Russia. It is located in the east of the oblast. Its administrative center is the city of Murom (which is not administratively a part of the district). Population:   26,382 (2002 Census);

Administrative and municipal status
Within the framework of administrative divisions, Muromsky District is one of the sixteen in the oblast. The city of Murom serves as its administrative center, despite being incorporated separately as an administrative unit with the status equal to that of the districts.

As a municipal division, the territory of the district is split between two municipal formations—Murom Urban Okrug, to which nine of the administrative district's rural localities belong, and Muromsky Municipal District, which covers the rest of the administrative district's territory.

References

Notes

Sources

Districts of Vladimir Oblast
 
